Maikol Francesco Negro (born 28 February 1988) is an Italian professional footballer who plays as a left winger.

Biography
Born in Lecce, Apulia, southern Italy, Negro started his career with northern Italy side Torino. Negro left its Primavera team in 2007 to Serie C2 side Celano. He scored 10 and 7 league goals in 2008–09 and in the first half of 2009–10 season.

On 20 January 2010, he left for Lega Pro Prima Divisione club Valle del Giovenco. As the club also signed Stefano Dall'Acqua and Giuseppe Caccavallo, he only made 6 start out of 10 league appearances for VdG. VdG went bankrupt in July 2010. He also partnered with Dall'Acqua at the relegation playoffs.

In August 2010, he was signed by Serie A club Catania on free transfer, but he was farmed to Prima Divisione club Nocerina. He made a successive appearances as substitute since made his debut in round 3.

On 12 October 2018, he signed with Serie C club Rende.

On 8 October 2019, he signed with Lecco.

International career
Negro capped for Italy under-20 Lega Pro representative team at 2008–09 Mirop Cup, scored a goal against Hungary.

References

External links
 
 Football.it Profile 

Living people
1988 births
Sportspeople from Lecce
Association football forwards
Italian footballers
Torino F.C. players
A.S.G. Nocerina players
Latina Calcio 1932 players
Benevento Calcio players
Pisa S.C. players
Calcio Lecco 1912 players
Serie B players
Serie C players
Footballers from Apulia
21st-century Italian people